The 1980 United States presidential election in Indiana took place on November 4, 1980. All 50 states and The District of Columbia were part of the 1980 United States presidential election. State voters chose 13 electors to the Electoral College, who voted for president and vice president.

Indiana was won by former California Governor Ronald Reagan (R) by 18 points. The state has voted Republican in every election since 1968, except in 2008 when it voted for Barack Obama. Despite that, Republicans would maintain a similar margin to 1980 in Indiana in future elections.

Results

Results by county

See also
 United States presidential elections in Indiana

References

Indiana
1980
1980 Indiana elections